Tumkuru may refer to:

Tumkuru, a city located in Karnataka
Tumakuru district, Karnataka